Sheuli Azim (born 2001) is a Bangladeshi women's football defender who plays as a right-back or a centre-back for Bashundhara Kings Women and the Bangladesh women's national football team. She previously played for the Bangladesh U-16 and the Bangladesh U-14, that won AFC U-14 Girls' Regional Championship – South and Central in 2015 in Nepal. She currently plays football at the Kolsindur High School in Mymensingh. She played all five matches at 2017 AFC U-16 Women's Championship qualification in Group C held in Dhaka, Bangladesh.

Early years 
Sheuli Azim was born on 20 December 2001 in  Kolsindur, Dhobaura, Mymensingh district.

Playing career 
Sheuli first played in 2011 Bangamata Sheikh Fazilatunnesa Mujib Gold Cup Football Tournament for Kalsindur Government Primary School.

International 
Sheuli Azim was selected to the Bangladesh girls' U-17 team for the 2017 AFC U-16 Women's Championship qualification – Group C matches. She played first time at the tournament in the match against Iran girls' U-17 on 27 August 2016. She capped 5 times for the U-17 nationals. Being group C champion, Bangladesh have qualified for the 2017 AFC U-16 Women's Championship in Thailand in September 2017.

Honours

Club 
Bashundhara Kings Women

 Bangladesh Women's Football League
 Winners (2): 2019–20, 2020–21

International 
SAFF Women's Championship
Winner : 2022
Runner-up : 2016
South Asian Games
Bronze : 2016
SAFF U-18 Women's Championship
Champion (1): 2018
Bangamata U-19 Women's International Gold Cup
Champion trophy shared (1): 2019
AFC U-14 Girls' Regional C'ship – South and Central
Bangladesh U-14 Girls'
Champion : 2015

References

External links 
 

2001 births
Living people
Bangladeshi women's footballers
Bangladesh women's international footballers
Bashundhara Kings players
Bangladesh Women's Football League players
Women's association football defenders
People from Mymensingh District
Bangladeshi women's futsal players
Kalsindur Government Primary School alumni
South Asian Games bronze medalists for Bangladesh
South Asian Games medalists in football